Ciudad Lineal is a station on Line 5 of the Madrid Metro. It is located in fare Zone A.

The station serves an important urban and regional bus terminal.

References 

Line 5 (Madrid Metro) stations
Railway stations in Spain opened in 1964
Buildings and structures in Ciudad Lineal District, Madrid